Sara Elizabeth Mitchell (born July 28, 1988), better known by her stage name Sirah , is an American rapper and singer from Los Angeles. She collaborated with Skrillex, on "WEEKENDS!!!", "Kyoto" and the hit single "Bangarang".

Background 
Mitchell was born on Long Island, New York, to a bluesman and an artist. Her youth included poverty, homelessness and alcoholism. She was repeatedly caught creating graffiti; she stopped after being arrested for it. She moved to Washington with her father at age six, but after he died of an overdose, she ended up returning to New York. There, she was arrested several times and eventually absconded to Los Angeles rather than be placed in foster care at age fifteen. For a while, she considered Union Station her home before purchasing a Jeep Cherokee and living in it in a garage in East Los Angeles; in an interview, she stated that she lived out of her car and felt safe in doing so.

Career 
Mitchell moved from singing to rapping after her mother gave a negative review of her voice, and mentioned that the turning point for her was when she heard Big Pun's Capital Punishment.

After moving to Los Angeles, she booked her own tours in such countries as Germany and Romania, sleeping on floors and collecting money from fans. Her first EP, Clean Windows Dirty Floors, was produced by DJ Hoppa. Her first LP, Smile You Have Teeth, was never released. Prior to its intended release, Mitchell's manager sent her a contract demanding $30,000 from the LP's proceeds. She subsequently decided to abandon the album and start anew.

Mitchell met Skrillex after she was contacted by him on MySpace, commending her work and requesting that they work together. The first track, WEEKENDS!!! was the result of Skrillex asking her to rap into his laptop the lyrics she was working on. Their second collaboration, "Bangarang", happened after he called her while he was on tour and asked her to record 16 bars about the Lost Boys. She forgot to close the window before recording it, and thus birds are audible in the recording. Mitchell has also released a mixtape, C.U.L.T.: Too Young to Die. After that she released another EP, Inhale.

Achievements 
At the 55th Annual Grammy Awards, Mitchell and Skrillex won the award for Best Dance Recording for their collaboration Bangarang. It is Mitchell's first Grammy win.

Influences 
Mitchell is influenced by Joni Mitchell, Big Pun, WHY?, Qwel, Black Thought, Erykah Badu, Lauryn Hill, Jewel, and Cat Stevens.

Discography

Albums

Mixtapes

EPs

Singles

Other appearances

References

External links 
Official website

Living people
Rappers from New York City
Rappers from Los Angeles
American women rappers
1988 births
Grammy Award winners for dance and electronic music
21st-century American rappers
21st-century American women musicians
Atlantic Records artists
21st-century women rappers